Sychevo is a rural locality (a village) in Nikolskoye Rural Settlement, Ustyuzhensky District, Vologda Oblast, Russia. The population was 71 as of 2002.

Geography 
Izlyadeyevo is the nearest rural locality.

References 

Rural localities in Ustyuzhensky District